Alias Enterprises is an American publishing company. Their main divisions are Alias Comics (all-ages comic books) and Cross Culture (Christian comic books). Based in San Diego, California, it was founded in January 2005 by Brett Burner and Mike S. Miller. They publish comics such as Lullaby, The 10th Muse, The Legend of Isis, and Sixgun Samurai.

History
Alias was founded by artist Mike S. Miller and publisher Brett Burner (also owner of Lamp Post Publications). In January 2005, they launched their first productions through Image Comics filling a virtually untapped market with three all-ages titles: Lullaby: Wisdom Seeker, Lions, Tigers and Bears, and The Imaginaries. All three were successful projects in the independent marketplace, particularly Lullaby, which has seen continuing success since its initial release. Also in 2005, Alias expanded into a self-publishing company with plans to launch 12 titles in April of that year with cover prices of 75 cents. The titles all shipped late and were released irregularly afterwards, but landed them a spot with Diamond Comic Distributors as a Top 20 Publisher.

Alias Comics offered 25-cent preview issues, 75-cent introductory issues, and 50,000 copies of free (to retailer) preview books called "the Comic Book Digest" as marketing efforts, but continued to have problems with shipping. In mid-2005, Alias chose to move its comic printing stateside, but due to the accumulation of problems at the domestic printer, decided to go back to its original partner in South Korea. The subsequent lapse in shipping, going from a domestic printer to a South Korean printer, resulted in a two- to three-month lapse in delivery of Alias comic books to comic stores. Being gone from the shelves for so long created several problems for the fledgling company, causing a loss of retailer and consumer confidence.

Nearly a year after opening their doors, several Alias comic book creators began to leave the publisher, citing various concerns. In 2005, studios Monkey Pharmacy, Runemaster Studios, and Dabel Brothers Productions stopped producing books for publication by Alias. In November, Alias underwent a restructuring plan. Its publisher, Brett Burner, purchased majority shares of the company in order to take control of the company's financial records.

In March 2006, Alias announced a new policy toward its creators requiring work to be completed and in-hand before being solicited for publication, citing an effort to maintain a more exact release schedule. Later, Alias signed an agreement with Christian publisher Zondervan to produce 24 manga or graphic novels to be released over the next few years through its Cross Culture division, consisting of three 8-book series. These titles included Hand of the Morningstar, Kingdoms, and The Manga Bible.

Also in 2006, Alias' Christian division, Cross Culture Entertainment, began publication of Bubblemag, a Christian pop culture magazine. In Fall 2006, Alias executives announced their intention to rebrand Alias Comics as a Christian comic company. Within a few weeks, Abacus Comics opened for business. Abacus Comics is owned solely by Miller, and was opened for the express purpose of publishing several of his "creator-owned" titles which were initially run through Alias Comics.

In 2007, Lamp Post Inc. obtained full rights to all Alias and Cross Culture properties, placing them under its label.

Publications
In alphabetical order:

 ArmorQuest: Genesis (2005–2006) by Ben Avery and Sherwin Schwartzrock
 Atomik Mike (2006) by Stephan Nilson
 The Blackbeard Legacy (2006–2007)
 Chrono Mechanics (2006) by Art Thibert and Richard Birdsall
 David: The Sheperd's Song (2005) by Royden Lepp
 David's Mighty Men (2005) by Javier Saltares
 Deal with the Devil (2005) by Mike S. Miller and Sherwin Schwartzrock
 The Devil's Keeper (2005) by Mike S. Miller, Sean Jordan, and Carlos Paul
 The Dreamland Chronicles (2005–2017) by Scott Christian Sava
 The Hammer Kid (2006) by Kevin Grevioux
 Hyper-Actives (2005–2006) by Darin Wagner and Clint Hilinski
 Judo Girl (2005–2006) by Darren G. Davis, Terrance Griep, and Nadir Balan
 Killer Stunts, Inc. (2005) by Scott Kinney
 Legacy Manga Digest (2005) by Carmen Trifilleti and Edu Francisco
 The Legend of Isis (2005–2006) by Ryan Scott Ottney, Darren G. Davis, et al.
 Lethal Instinct (2005)
 Lullaby vol. 2 (2005–2006) by Mike S. Miller and Hector Sevilla
 Monkey in a Wagon vs. Lemur on a Big Wheel (2005) by Ken Lillie-Paetz and Chris Moreno
 Opposite Forces vol. 2 (2005) by Tom Bancroft
 Orion the Hunter (2006)
 OZF5 (2005) by Ramon Madrigal and Ryan Ottley
 Pakkins' Land vol. 2 (2005) by Gary Shipman
 Psi-Kix (2005)
 Revere (2006) by Ed Lavallee and Grant Bond
 Sixgun Samurai (2005–2006) by Mike S. Miller, Sean Jordan, and Harold Edge
 Super Teen*Topia (2006) by Kirk Kushin
 Ted Noodleman: Bicycle Delivery Boy (2005) by Jim Keplinger and Ryan Ottley
 Tenth Muse vol. 3 (2005–2006) by Darren G. Davis, et al.
 TwinBlades (2006) by Adrian Todd and Ryan Odagawa
 Valkyries (2006) by Kevin Grevioux
 Victoria's Secret Service (2005) by Darren G. Davis and Nadir Balan
 Yenny vol. 2 (2005–2006) by David Álvarez

Comics that went to other venues after publication at Alias:

 Monkey in a Wagon vs. Lemur on a Big Wheel (went to Silent Devil Productions)
 Elsinore (went to Devil's Due Publishing)
 Lions, Tigers and Bears (went to Image Comics)
 XIII (uncensored trade paperbacks by Dabel Brothers Productions)

Comics that came to Alias after initial publication at another venue:

 Chrono Mechanics (came from Image Comics)

Cancelled Alias comics:

 The Gimoles

Circulation
According to the sales estimates from industry resource site ICv2, Alias' top-selling monthly comics for their first year were: 

 May 2005: 4,945 copies (rank 188) of 10th Muse vol. 2, #1
 June 2005: 7,836 copies (rank 214) of Lethal Instinct #1
 July 2005: 4,005 copies (rank 203) of Legend of Isis #2
 August 2005: 3,546 copies (rank 242) of Legend of Isis #3
 September 2005: 3,286 copies (rank 222) of XIII #2
 October 2005: 3,352 copies (rank 243) of Legend of Isis #4
 November 2005: 7,432 copies (rank 195) of Lullaby #1
 December 2005: 3,038 copies (rank 251) of Legend of Isis #7
 January 2006: 3,886 copies (rank 208) of Lullaby #2
 February 2006: -- no issue shipped, only a TPB
 March 2006: 3,909 copies (rank 261) of Victoria's Secret Service #1
 April 2006: 4,701 copies (rank 210) of Lullaby #3
 May 2006: 2,959 copies (rank 291) of Blackbeard Legacy #1

NOTE: These are only initial pre-order sales via Diamond Comic Distributors U.S. and do not include possible reorders or sales through other channels.

References

External links
 
 "The Class of 2005: A Tough Year for Comics Start-Ups" January 2006 look at Alias' and Speakeasy's problems (by Heidi MacDonald at Publishers Weekly)
 "State of the Union 2006: Alias" February 2006 short interview with Mike S. Miller about 2005 and 2006 for Alias and Cross Culture (by Rik Offenberger at Newsarama).

 
Comic book publishing companies of the United States
Companies based in San Diego
Publishing companies established in 2005
Privately held companies based in California
Lists of comics by publisher